The Optimist is a 1984 album by the New Zealand band DD Smash, their final studio album led by Dave Dobbyn before he launched his solo career. The album reached number 6 on the New Zealand music charts and remained in the chart for 26 weeks.

Track listing

Charts

Weekly charts

Year-end charts

Certifications

References

External links
 Official website of Dave Dobbyn
 Muzic Net NZ
 NZ Music.com

DD Smash albums
1984 albums